Mohammed Al-Towil (born 10 February 1991) is a football plays for Al-Thoqbah as a goalkeeper.

External links 
 

1991 births
Living people
Ettifaq FC players
Khaleej FC players
Al-Nojoom FC players
Al-Thoqbah Club players
Saudi Arabian footballers
Saudi First Division League players
Saudi Professional League players
Saudi Second Division players
Saudi Third Division players
People from Dammam
Association football goalkeepers